David Greenhill (born 8 July 1985 in Edinburgh) is a Scottish professional footballer, who plays in midfield, for Broxburn Athletic.

He was capped by the Scotland Schoolboys in 2002.

Career
Greenhill began his career with St Johnstone, although he did not play for the first team. He then moved to Clyde on a full-time deal and played in their under-19 side for a year, before moving up the first team in the 2004–05 season. He made his senior début coming off the bench against Raith Rovers in August 2004. He was then sent out to Montrose on a season long loan, but this was cut short, and he returned to Clyde at Christmas due to injury. He played for Clyde a further 4 times before leaving in July 2005.

He spent a year at Alloa Athletic before moving to Berwick Rangers, where he helped the club achieve promotion from the Third Division in the 2006–07 season. Greenhill played for Berwick for six seasons, before moving to East Stirlingshire in 2012.

On 2 June 2015, Greenhill signed for Lowland League side Spartans.

Greenhill signed with Broxburn Athletic in June 2020.

References

External links

Living people
1985 births
Footballers from Edinburgh
Scottish footballers
Berwick Rangers F.C. players
St Johnstone F.C. players
Clyde F.C. players
Montrose F.C. players
Alloa Athletic F.C. players
East Stirlingshire F.C. players
Spartans F.C. players
Scottish Football League players
Scottish Professional Football League players
Lowland Football League players
Association football midfielders
Broxburn Athletic F.C. players